is a railway station  in the village of  Matsukawa, Nagano Prefecture, Japan, operated by East Japan Railway Company (JR East).

Lines
Shinano-Matsukawa Station is served by the Ōito Line and is 26.0 kilometers from the terminus of the line at Matsumoto Station.

Station layout
The station consists of one ground-level island platform connected to the station building by a level crossing. The station has a Midori no Madoguchi staffed ticket office.

Platforms

History
The Shinano Railway was integrated into the Japanese Government Railways on 1 June 1937 and the station was renamed to its present name the same day. With the privatization of Japanese National Railways (JNR) on 1 April 1987 the station came under the control of JR East.

Passenger statistics
In fiscal 2015, the station was used by an average of 601 passengers daily (boarding passengers only).

Surrounding area

 Matsukawa village hall
 Matsukawa post office

See also
 List of railway stations in Japan

Notes

References

External links

 JR East station information 

Railway stations in Nagano Prefecture
Ōito Line
Railway stations in Japan opened in 1915
Stations of East Japan Railway Company
Matsukawa, Nagano (Kitaazumi)